In analytic geometry, the intersection of a line and a plane in three-dimensional space can be the empty set, a point, or a line. It is the entire line if that line is embedded in the plane, and is the empty set if the line is parallel to the plane but outside it. Otherwise, the line cuts through the plane at a single point.

Distinguishing these cases, and determining equations for the point and line in the latter cases, have use in computer graphics, motion planning, and collision detection.

Algebraic form
In vector notation, a plane can be expressed as the set of points  for which

The vector equation for a line is

Substituting the equation for the line into the equation for the plane gives

Expanding gives

And solving for  gives

If  then the line and plane are parallel. There will be two cases: if  then the line is contained in the plane, that is, the line intersects the plane at each point of the line. Otherwise, the line and plane have no intersection.

If  there is a single point of intersection. The value of  can be calculated and the point of intersection, is given by
.

Parametric form

A line is described by all points that are a given direction from a point. A general point on a line passing through points  and  can be represented as 

Similarly a general point on a plane determined by the triangle defined by the points ,  and  can be represented as

The point at which the line intersects the plane is therefore described by setting the point on the line equal to the point on the plane, giving the parametric equation:

This can be rewritten as

which can be expressed in matrix form as

where the vectors are written as column vectors.

The determinant of the matrix can be calculated as
 

If the determinant is zero, then there is no unique solution; the line is either in the plane or parallel to it.

If a unique solution exists (determinant is not 0), then it can be found by inverting the matrix and rearranging:

which expands to

and then to

thus giving the solutions:
 
 
 
The point of intersection is then equal to

Uses
In the ray tracing method of computer graphics a surface can be represented as a set of pieces of planes. The intersection of a ray of light with each plane is used to produce an image of the surface. In vision-based 3D reconstruction, a subfield of computer vision, depth values are commonly measured by so-called triangulation method, which finds the intersection between light plane and ray reflected toward camera.

The algorithm can be generalised to cover intersection with other planar figures, in particular, the intersection of a polyhedron with a line.

See also
Plücker coordinates#Plane-line meet calculating the intersection when the line is expressed by Plücker coordinates.
Plane–plane intersection

External links 
 Intersections of Lines, Segments and Planes (2D & 3D) from GeomAlgorithms.com

Euclidean geometry
Computational physics
Geometric algorithms
Geometric intersection
Planes (geometry)
cs:Analytická geometrie#Vzájemná poloha dvou rovin v třírozměrném prostoru